Süleyman Askerî Bey, also known as Suleyman Askeri, Sulayman Askari, Sulaiman al-Askari (Turkish: Süleyman Askeri) and unofficially known as Suleyman Askeri Pasha (1884 in Prizren, Kosovo Vilayet – 14 April 1915 in Berjasiya) was a military officer who served in the Ottoman Army. Askerî was of Circassian descent and co founder of the Teşkilât-ı Mahsusa (Special Organisation), a group involved in guerilla warfare.

Life
Süleyman Askerî was born to General Vehbi Pasha, who served as military staff at Edirne in 1898 and then in Anatolia, in 1884 in Prizren. He graduated from the Ottoman Military Academy in 1902 and graduated from the Ottoman Military College on 5 November 1905 as Distinguished Captain (Mümtaz Yüzbaşı ).

He was assigned to Monastir (present-day Bitola) under the command of the Third Army stationed at Salonica (present-day Thessaloniki). During the days he stayed in Monastir, he joined the Committee of Union and Progress and he married Fadime Hanım, who was an aristocrat of Filibe (present-day Plovdiv). They had two daughters, Fatma and Dilek. During the Young Turk Revolution (1908), First Lieutenant Atıf Kamçıl stated that he asked the CUP Monastir branch for a gun and had talks with Süleyman Askerî, the branch's guide about the assassination of Shemsi Pasha. Askerî was closest friend of Kuşçubaşzade Eşref (Sencer). According to Philip Hendrick Stoddard, he was a brother-in-law of Mehmed Nuri (Conker), who was the oldest friend of Mustafa Kemal (Atatürk).

In 1909, he was promoted to the rank of Kolağası and appointed to the gendarmerie regiment in Baghdad. In 1911, after the Kingdom of Italy invaded the vilayet of Tripoli (present-day Libya), he went there and participated in operations in Benghazi. In 1912, he took part in the Balkan Wars as the chief of staff of Trabzon Redif Division and then became the Chief of the General Staff of the provisional government (31 August 1913 – 25 October 1913) established in Western Thrace. On 13 November 1913, he was appointed to the chief of the Ottoman Special Organisation when it was officially formed.

He took his own life in 1915 during a series of devastating Ottoman military defeats, in the middle of a British Ambush on the outskirts of Kut, Iraq.

See also
Battle of Shaiba

Sources

External links
 Fortna, Benjamin C.: Askerî Bey, Süleymân, in: 1914-1918-online. International Encyclopedia of the First World War.

1884 births
1915 deaths
People from Prizren
People from Kosovo vilayet
Committee of Union and Progress politicians
Ottoman Army officers
Members of the Special Organization (Ottoman Empire)
Ottoman military personnel of the Italo-Turkish War
Ottoman military personnel of the Balkan Wars
Ottoman military personnel killed in World War I
Ottoman Military Academy alumni
Ottoman Military College alumni
Ottoman military personnel who committed suicide
People from the Ottoman Empire of Circassian descent